Katarzyna Piskorska (2 March 1937 – 10 April 2010) was a Polish sculptor.

She died in the 2010 Polish Air Force Tu-154 crash near Smolensk on 10 April 2010. She was posthumously awarded the Order of Polonia Restituta.

References

1937 births
2010 deaths
Polish women sculptors
Polish Scouts and Guides
Knights of the Order of Polonia Restituta
Victims of the Smolensk air disaster
20th-century Polish sculptors
20th-century Polish women artists
21st-century Polish women artists
21st-century Polish sculptors